First Camden National Bank & Trust, or the Camden Academic Building, is located in Camden, Camden County, New Jersey, United States. The building was built in 1928 and was added to the National Register of Historic Places on August 24, 1990.

The bank that was headquartered here changed its name to "South Jersey National Bank" in the 1960s and to "Heritage Bank" in the 1970s. It later merged with Midlantic National Bank, which was ultimately acquired by PNC Bank.

In 2016, the building was renovated and became the Rowan University Camden Academic Building
 The old vaults were converted to student lounges.

See also
National Register of Historic Places listings in Camden County, New Jersey

References

Commercial buildings on the National Register of Historic Places in New Jersey
Neoclassical architecture in New Jersey
Commercial buildings completed in 1928
Buildings and structures in Camden, New Jersey
National Register of Historic Places in Camden County, New Jersey
1928 establishments in New Jersey
New Jersey Register of Historic Places
Bank buildings on the National Register of Historic Places in New Jersey
Rowan University
Education in Camden, New Jersey
University and college buildings on the National Register of Historic Places in New Jersey